A bondage rigger is a person who practices the art of applying bondage, using any of a variety of materials such as rope, leather straps, or metal restraints.

Bondage riggers may participate in bondage for many reasons. These may include: as a form of BDSM or D/s play for personal enjoyment; as an art form, such as in the Japanese bondage styles shibari and kinbaku; or as an enterprise for profit, by selling books, videos, or photographs.

Bondage riggers work with one or more rope bottoms or bondage models, or may tie themselves in a practice called self-rigging or self-suspension. Some rope bottoms and bondage models are bondage riggers themselves.

Responsible bondage riggers always follow the principles of risk-aware consensual kink (RACK) when rigging.

Notable examples
 Go Arisue (Japan)
 Damon Pierce (USA)
 Graydancer (USA)
 Jeff Gord (USA)
 John Willie (USA)
 Lee Harrington (USA)
 Matthias T. J. Grimme (Germany)
 Midori (USA)
 Randa Mai (Japan)

See also
Nawashi
Bondage pornography
Fetish art

References

Further reading 

 Arisue Go, Kinbaku Theory and Practices, Sanwa Publishing, 2008
 Arisue Go, Kinbaku Mind and Techniques 1, Jugoya, 2009
 Arisue Go, Kinbaku Mind and Techniques 2 (Floor Works 1), Jugoya, 2009
 Chanta Rose, Bondage For Sex, BDSM Press, 2006. .
 Douglas Kent, Complete Shibari Volume 1: Land, Mental Gears Publishing, 2010. .
 Douglas Kent, Complete Shibari Volume 2: Sky, Mental Gears Publishing, 2010. .
 Esinem, Japanese Rope Bondage DVD shibari tutorials, http://www.shibari.co/
 Jay Wiseman, Jay Wiseman's Erotic Bondage Handbook, Greenery Press, 2000. .
 Lee "Bridgett" Harrington, Circle23, Shibari You Can Use, Mystic Productions, 2006. .
 Midori, Craig Morey, The Seductive Art of Japanese Bondage, Greenery Press, 2001. .
 Two Knotty Boys, Larry Utley, Two Knotty Boys Showing You the Ropes, Green Candy Press, 2006. .